Katha Dilam is a 1991 Bengali film directed by Rajat Das and produced by N. S. S. Film Concern under the banner of  N. S. S. Film Concern. The film features actors Prosenjit Chatterjee and Ayesha Jhulka in the lead roles. Music of the film has been composed by Ajoy Das.

Cast 
 Prosenjit Chatterjee as Sanjay
 Ayesha Jhulka as Anita Chatterjee
 Shakuntala Barua as Mrs. Sunita Chatterjee
 Sukhen Das as Ranga, Mrs. Chatterjee's henchman
 Sumitra Mukherjee as Sanjay's mother
 Soumitra Bandopadhyay as Jibon Dutt
 N. Vishwanathan as Satya Sen

References 

Bengali-language Indian films
1991 films
1990s Bengali-language films
Films scored by Ajoy Das